Hercynella is a genus of fossil bivalves of late Silurian or (more commonly) Early Devonian age, found in Europe, North America, western Asia, North Africa and Australia. The name was also invalidly applied to a genus of moths now known as Tulaya.

Species were originally thought to be patellid gastropods and it was not until 1950 that H. & G. Termier realised that they were bivalves. Prantl (1959) showed that both left and right valves could occur in two forms, which had in the past led to palaeontologists erecting two species where there was only one.

The best review of the genus is Forney et al. (1981).

References 

 H. & G. Termier (1950) On the systematic position of the genus Hercynella Kayser. Proceedings of the Malacological Society London 28 (4-5): 156–162.
 F. Prantl (1959). Die systematische Stellung der Gattung Hercynella Kayser (Pelecypoda). Paläontologische Zeitschrift Volume 34, Number 2, 150–153.
 Forney, G.G., Boucot, A.J., and Rohr, D.M.(1981) Silurian and Lower Devonian zoogeography of selected molluscan genera, in Gray, Jane, Boucot, A.J., and Berry, W.B.N., eds., Communities of the past. Stroudsberg, Penn., Hutchinson Ross, p. 119–164.

Praecardiida
Prehistoric bivalve genera
Silurian bivalves
Devonian bivalves
Paleozoic animals of Africa
Prehistoric invertebrates of Oceania
Prehistoric animals of Europe
Paleozoic molluscs of North America
Bertie Formation